Agalychnis medinai, also known as the Rancho Grande leaf frog, is a species of frog in the subfamily Phyllomedusinae. It is endemic to the central part of the Venezuelan Coastal Range.

It is a rarely spotted arboreal frog, usually seen in temporal or permanents pools, its breeding habitat, during the wet season. It can also live in secondary forests near artificial bodies of water. It is threatened by forest loss and extraction of surface water. Its range overlaps with the Yurubí National Park and, at least formerly, with the Henri Pittier National Park, where its type locality is located – it has not been sighted there during the last decades.

References

medinae
Amphibians of Venezuela
Endemic fauna of Venezuela
Amphibians described in 1962
Taxonomy articles created by Polbot